This is a list of Jasminum (jasmine) species. 

Jasminum abyssinicum Hochst. ex DC.  – forest jasmine 
Jasminum adenophyllum Wall. – bluegrape jasmine, pinwheel jasmine, princess jasmine
Jasminum aemulum R.Br. 
Jasminum albicalyx Kobuski
Jasminum andamanicum N.P.Balakr. & N.G.Nair
Jasminum angolense Welw. ex Baker
Jasminum angulare Vahl – angular jasmine, wild jasmine
Jasminum angustifolium (L.) Willd. – wild jasmine
Jasminum arborescens Roxb.
Jasminum attenuatum Roxb.
Jasminum auriculatum Vahl
Jasminum azoricum L. – lemon-scented jasmine
Jasminum bakeri Scott-Elliot
Jasminum beesianum Forrest & Diels
Jasminum bignoniaceum G.Don
Jasminum brachyscyphum Baker
Jasminum breviflorum Harv. ex C.H.Wright
Jasminum calcareum F.Muell.
Jasminum calophyllum Wall
Jasminum campyloneurum Gilg & Schellenb.
Jasminum choense Delile 
Jasminum cinnamomifolium Kobuski
Jasminum craibianum Kerr
Jasminum dallachii F.Muell.
Jasminum dasyphyllum Gilg & Schellenb.
Jasminum dichotomum Vahl – Gold Coast jasmine
Jasminum didymum G.Forst.
Jasminum dinklagei Gilg & G.Schellenb.
Jasminum dispermum Wall.
Jasminum divaricatum R.Br.
Jasminum duclouxii (H. Léveillé) Rehder 
Jasminum elegans Knobl.
Jasminum elongatum (P. J. Bergius) Willd.
Jasminum flavovirens Gilg & Schellenb.
Jasminum flexile Vahl
Jasminum floridum Bunge
Jasminum fluminense Vell.
Jasminum fruticans L.
Jasminum fuchsiifolium Gagnep.
Jasminum glaucum (L.f.) W.T.Aiton
Jasminum grandiflorum L. – Catalan jasmine, royal jasmine, Spanish jasmine 
Jasminum guangxiense B. M. Miao
Jasminum hongshuihoense Jien ex B. M. Miao 
Jasminum humile L. – Italian yellow jasmine 
Jasminum kajewskii C.T.White
Jasminum kerstingii Gilg & G.Schellenb.
Jasminum lanceolarium Roxb.
Jasminum lasiosepalum Gilg & Schellenb.
Jasminum laurifolium Roxb.
Jasminum lang Gagnep.
Jasminum leratii Schltr.
Jasminum longipetalum King & Gamble
Jasminum longitubum L. C. Chia ex B. M. Miao
Jasminum malabaricum Wight
Jasminum mesnyi Hance – Japanese jasmine, primrose jasmine, yellow jasmine 
Jasminum meyeri-johannis Engl. 
Jasminum microcalyx Hance
Jasminum molle R.Br
Jasminum mossamedense Hiern
Jasminum multiflorum (Burm.f.) Andrews
Jasminum multipartitum Hochst.
Jasminum narcissiodorum Gilg & Schellenb.
Jasminum nardydorum Breteler
Jasminum newtonii Gilg & Schellenb.
Jasminum nervosumLoureiro
Jasminum niloticum Gilg
Jasminum nintooides Rehder
Jasminum noldeanum Knobl.
Jasminum nudiflorum Lindl.
Jasminum obtusifolium Baker
Jasminum odoratissimum L. – yellow jasmine
Jasminum officinale L. – common jasmine, poet's jasmine, jasmine, jessamine 
Jasminum parkeri Dunn – dwarf jasmine
Jasminum pauciflorum Benth.
Jasminum pentaneurum Handel-Mazzetti
Jasminum pierreanum Gagnep.
Jasminum polyanthum Franch.
Jasminum prainii H. Léveillé
Jasminum preussii Engl. & Knobl.
Jasminum pubigerum D. Don
Jasminum punctulatum Chiov.
Jasminum quinatum Schinz
Jasminum rehderianum Kobuski
Jasminum rex Dunn
Jasminum rufohirtum Gagnep.
Jasminum sambac (L.) Aiton – Arabian jasmine 
Jasminum schimperi Vatke
Jasminum schroeterianum Schinz
Jasminum seguinii H. Léveillé
Jasminum simplicifolium G.Forst.
Jasminum simplicifolium subsp. australiense P.S.Green 	
Jasminum simplicifolium subsp. funale (Decne.) Kiew 	
Jasminum simplicifolium subsp. le-ratii (Schltr.) P.S.Green 	
Jasminum simplicifolium subsp. sootepense (Craib) ined. 	
Jasminum simplicifolium subsp. suavissimum (Lindl.) P.S.Green
Jasminum sinense Hemsley
Jasminum stans Pax
Jasminum stenolobum Rolfe
Jasminum stephanense Lemoine
Jasminum streptopus E.Mey. 
Jasminum suavissimum Lindl.
Jasminum subglandulosum Kurz
Jasminum subhumile W. W. Sm.
Jasminum subtriplinerve Blume
Jasminum thomense Exell
Jasminum tonkinense Gagnep.
Jasminum tortuosum Willd.
Jasminum undulatum Ker Gawl.
Jasminum urophyllum Hemsl.
Jasminum verdickii De Wild.
Jasminum wengeri C. E. C. Fischer
Jasminum yuanjiangense P. Y. Bai

References

External links

Jasminum